Richard Middleton may refer to:

Richard Middleton (Lord Chancellor) (died 1272), English theologian, philosopher and Lord Chancellor
Richard Barham Middleton (1882–1911), British poet and ghost story writer
Richard Middleton (priest) (died 1641), Anglican Dean of St David's
Richard Middleton (musicologist), English musicologist and academic
Richard Middleton (political agent) (1846–1905), English Conservative activist
Rick Middleton (born 1953), ice hockey player
Rick Middleton (American football) (born 1951), former American football player

See also
Richard Myddelton (disambiguation)
Richard of Middleton (1249–1306), member of the Franciscan Order, theologian and philosopher